Arch Hill was one of 80 electorates in New Zealand between 1946 and 1954. Located in central Auckland, the electorate was considered a safe seat for the Labour Party in its eight years of existence.

Arch Hill was one of many urban electorates created as part of the 1946 electoral redistribution. The 1946 redistribution abolished the country quota, which had previously accorded 28% greater representation for rural electorates.

Overview
The 1941 New Zealand census had been cancelled due to World War II, so the 1946 electoral redistribution had to take ten years of population growth and movement into account. The North Island gained a further two electorates from the South Island due to faster population growth. The abolition of the country quota through the Electoral Amendment Act, 1945 reduced the number and increased the size of rural electorates and had the opposite effect for electorates in urban areas like Auckland. None of the 80 existing electorates remained unchanged; 27 electorates were abolished, eight former electorates were re-established, and 19 electorates were created for the first time, including Arch Hill. The Arch Hill electorate was formed out of portions of the Auckland Central, Auckland West, and Grey Lynn electorates. It was centred on the suburb of Arch Hill, and included parts of Grey Lynn, Eden Terrace, Newton, and southern Ponsonby.

The Arch Hill electorate was abolished through the 1952 electoral redistribution, when it was absorbed into the neighbouring electorates of Auckland Central, Ponsonby, and Eden.

History
Parry retired at the end of the parliamentary term in 1951, and died a year later on 27 November 1952.

When the Arch Hill electorate was abolished in 1954, Stewart contested the  electorate, but was beaten by National's Duncan Rae.

Members of Parliament
Key

Election results

1951 election

1949 election

1946 election

Notes

References

Historical electorates of New Zealand
1946 establishments in New Zealand
1954 disestablishments in New Zealand
Politics of the Auckland Region